Between Two Worlds is the only album  by Norwegian black metal supergroup I. The album was recorded at the Lydriket Studio and later mixed by Peter Tägtgren at the Abyss studio. The album showcases Abbath's straightforward metal style rather than his black metal style. The album displays a clear influence from classic metal bands, which although present in Abbath's primary band Immortal, is here the sole focus of the music. A limited edition digipack was released, which includes three bonus tracks. A limited edition metal box was also released, also featuring the three bonus tracks, and was limited to 1000 copies.

Track listing

Personnel 
 Abbath (Olve Eikemo) – vocals, guitars, arrangements
 T.C. King (Tom Cato Visnes) – bass
 Ice Dale (Arve Isdal)  – guitars, arrangements, production
 Armagedda – drums
 Demonaz (Harald Nævdal) – lyrics

Production 
Peter Tägtgren – mixing
Geir Luedy – engineering
Herbrand Larsen – engineering
Kristian Tvedt – editing
Thomas Erberger – mastering
Martin Kvamme – cover design, artwork
Hakon Grav for Photograve management – management

References

External links 
 Official Website of I

2006 debut albums
I (band) albums
Nuclear Blast albums